The 2004 United States presidential election in New Jersey took place on November 2, 2004, and was part of the 2004 United States presidential election. Voters chose 15 representatives, or electors to the Electoral College, who voted for president and vice president.

New Jersey was won by Democratic nominee John Kerry by a 6.7% margin of victory. Prior to the election, most news organizations considered it as a state Kerry would win, or a blue state. Due to the impact of the September 11, 2001 attacks, however, and Governor James McGreevey's resignation amidst scandal, the state was considered a potentially closer than usual race. Polls showed Senator John F. Kerry with a slim lead throughout the campaign and the Republicans invested some campaign funds in the state. In the end, Kerry carried New Jersey by a comfortable margin, albeit narrower than usual for a 21st-century Democrat.

This remains the only election since 1880 in which the Republican nominee won the popular vote without New Jersey, and the only time it voted for the popular vote loser since 1976. , this is the last election in which the Democratic margin of victory was in single digits, or that the Republican won Somerset County.

Primaries
 New Jersey 2004 Democratic presidential primary

Campaign

Predictions
There were 12 news organizations who made state-by-state predictions of the election. Here are their last predictions before election day.

 D.C. Political Report: Slight Democrat
 Associated Press: Solid Kerry
 CNN: Kerry
Cook Political Report: Likely Democrat
 Newsweek: Leans Kerry
 The New York Times: Leans Kerry
 Rasmussen Reports: Kerry
 Research 2000: Solid Kerry
 The Washington Post: Kerry
 Washington Times: Solid Kerry
Zogby International: Kerry
 Washington Dispatch: Kerry

Polling
Kerry won most of the pre-election polls taken in this state, but mostly by small margins. The final 3 polling average showed the Democratic leading 49% to 42%.

Fundraising
Bush raised $5,934,011. Kerry raised $6,513,274.

Advertising and visits
President George W. Bush visited Marlton, New Jersey, in Burlington County for a rally on October 18, 2004.

Analysis
Generally, Kerry was very dominant in the urban centers of the state, particularly in Essex, Hudson, and Camden Counties. However, Bush made inroads in Bergen County, where many wealthy residents reside, and in other South Jersey counties. Bush controlled largely rural parts of the state, such as the Northwest (Hunterdon, Somerset, and Morris are also among the 10 wealthiest counties in America) and Salem County. Monmouth County's wealthy population and Ocean and Cape May Counties' older population also contributed to Bush's relative success in this largely Democratic state. This would also be the first election in which a Northern Democrat carried New Jersey since 1960 when fellow Massachusetts Democrat John F. Kennedy did so. The previous three Democratic presidential candidates to carry the state were all from the South (Lyndon B. Johnson was from Texas, Bill Clinton from Arkansas, and Al Gore from Tennessee), even though New Jersey is a northern state.

Results

By county

Counties that flipped from Democratic to Republican
Salem (largest municipality: Pennsville Township)
Monmouth (largest municipality: Middletown Township)

By congressional district
Kerry won 7 of 13 congressional districts.

Electors

Technically the voters of NJ cast their ballots for electors: representatives to the Electoral College. NJ is allocated 15 electors because it has 13 congressional districts and 2 senators. All candidates who appear on the ballot or qualify to receive write-in votes must submit a list of 15 electors, who pledge to vote for their candidate and his or her running mate. Whoever wins the majority of votes in the state is awarded all 15 electoral votes. Their chosen electors then vote for president and vice president. Although electors are pledged to their candidate and running mate, they are not obligated to vote for them. An elector who votes for someone other than his or her candidate is known as a faithless elector.

The electors of each state and the District of Columbia met on December 13, 2004, to cast their votes for president and vice president. The Electoral College itself never meets as one body. Instead the electors from each state and the District of Columbia met in their respective capitols.

The following were the members of the Electoral College from the state. All 15 were pledged for Kerry/Edwards.
 Warren Wallace
 Wilfredo Caraballo
 Tom Canzanella
 Carolyn Walch
 Peggy Anastos
 Bernard Kenny
 Ronald Rice
 Abed Awad
 Jack McGreevey - (Father of former Gov. James McGreevey)
 Wendy Benchle
 Loni Kaplan
 Carolyn Wade
 Riletta L. Cream
 Bernadette McPherson
Upendra Chivukula

See also
 United States presidential elections in New Jersey
 Presidency of George W. Bush

References

External links
Official Results (New Jersey Division of Elections)
Official Results by municipality

New Jersey
2004
2004 New Jersey elections